Dawn of Life (Spanish:Amanecer a la vida) is a 1950 Venezuelan drama film directed by Fernando Cortés and starring Susana Guízar, Luis Salazar and Néstor Zavarce.

Cast
 Susana Guízar
 Luis Salazar 
 Néstor Zavarce 
 Tomás Henríquez 
 Jorge Reyes 
 Helvia Hazz de Zapata
 Leon Bravo
 Leopoldo Alvarez 
 David Peraza
 Olga Corser 
 Herminia de Martucci
 Berta Moncayo 
 Jorge Tuero 
 Paul Antillano 
 Maria Garcia
 Josefina Briseño 
 Gilberto Pinto
 Eva y Miguel as Pareja de Baile

References

Bibliography 
 Darlene J. Sadlier. Latin American Melodrama: Passion, Pathos, and Entertainment. University of Illinois Press, 2009.

External links 
 

1950 films
1950 drama films
Venezuelan drama films
1950s Spanish-language films
Venezuelan black-and-white films